Berit Wiacker (born 15 June 1982 in Duisburg) is a German bobsledder who has competed since 2002. She won two gold medals in the mixed bobsleigh-skeleton team event at the FIBT World Championships (2007, 2008).

Prior to being in bobsleigh, Wiacker was a track and field athlete in the 100 metres hurdles.

Career highlights

World Championships
2007 - St. Moritz,  1st with Kleber / Kiriasis / Riekewald (team)
European Championships
2008 - Cesana,  1st with Sandra Kiriasis
World Cup
2004 - Igls,  1st with Sandra Kiriasis
2004 - Cortina d'Ampezzo,  1st with Sandra Kiriasis
2005 - Cesana,  1st with Sandra Kiriasis
2005 - Lake Placid,  2nd with Susi Erdmann
2005 - Igls,  1st with Sandra Kiriasis
2006 - St. Moritz,  2nd with Sandra Kiriasis
2007 - Königssee,  1st with Sandra Kiriasis
2007 - Calgary,  3rd with Sandra Kiriasis
2008 - Cesana,  3rd with Sandra Kiriasis

References
 Bobsleighsport.com profile
 BSD profile 
 
 Mixed bobsleigh-skeleton world championship medalists since 2007

1982 births
Living people
German female hurdlers
German female bobsledders
Sportspeople from Duisburg
21st-century German women